The Call House is a private residence located at 450 East Ridge Street in the Arch and Ridge Streets Historic District in Marquette, Michigan.  The house is also known as the Henry R. and Mary Hewitt Mather House.  It was designated a Michigan State Historic Site in 1971 and listed on the National Register of Historic Places in 1972.

History 
The Call House was designed and built in 1867 by Carl F. Struck for Henry R. Mather.  Mather was the first president of the Cleveland Iron Mining Company.   The house was later used by U.S. Supreme Court Justice George Shiras Jr. as a summer home, and was used by Charles H. Call, president of the First National Bank and Marquette County Savings Bank.

Description 
The house is a particularly noteworthy example of Gothic Revival architecture.  It is a -story structure, built of wood with steeply pitched gables and dormers, vertical board-and-batten siding, and arched windows.  The first floor boasts tall, six-pane windows.

References 

Buildings and structures in Marquette, Michigan
Houses in Marquette County, Michigan
Houses on the National Register of Historic Places in Michigan
Carpenter Gothic architecture in Michigan
Houses completed in 1875
Michigan State Historic Sites
Historic district contributing properties in Michigan
National Register of Historic Places in Marquette County, Michigan